Dabong (Jawi: دابوڠ), also known as Kuala Krai Selatan, is a small town in Kuala Krai District, Kelantan, Malaysia. It has a railway station. The famous Gua Ikan (Fish Cave) is situated nearby on the Galas River.

Dabong is one out of four state seats in the Kuala Krai constituency.

Education

Primary school

 Sekolah Kebangsaan Mempelam Jelawang
 Sekolah Kebangsaan Kuala Geris
 Sekolah Kebangsaan Kemubu
 Sekolah Kebangsaan Dabong
 Sekolah Kebangsaan Biak
 Sekolah Kebangsaan Sri Mahligai

Secondary school
 Sekolah Menengah Kebangsaan Dabong

External links

Kuala Lumpur MRT & KTM Intercity Integrations

Kuala Krai District
Towns in Kelantan